Cardurnock is a small settlement in Cumbria, England. The western extension of the Hadrian's Wall frontier defences once passed through the Cardurnock peninsula, though not the Wall itself. The sites of two small Roman fortlets, Milefortlet 4 and Milefortlet 5, have been located to the north and south of Cardurnock.
It is adjacent to the Anthorn Radio Station.

Location 

The Building or site itself may lie within the Boundary of more than one Authority.

References

External links

Cardurnock at Streetmap.co.uk

Hamlets in Cumbria
Roman sites in Cumbria
Populated coastal places in Cumbria
Allerdale